This is a list of episodes of the BBC Radio 4 comedy Old Harry's Game.  All episodes were written by Andy Hamilton and produced by Paul Mayhew-Archer. All titles are taken from the BBC episode guide.

Series overview 

All series episodes and the Olympic Specials episodes are available to purchase and download via iTunes

Episodes

Series 1 (1995)

Series 2 (1998)

Series 3 (1999)

Series 4 (2001)

Christmas specials (2002–3)

Series 5 (2005)

Series 6 (2007)

Series 7 (2009)

Christmas specials (2010)

Olympics specials (2012)

References

Lists of British radio series episodes